The Tradewater River is a tributary of the Ohio River, approximately  long, in western Kentucky in the United States.

Description
It flows generally northwest in a tight meandering course, past Pennyrile Forest State Resort Park, where a tributary is impounded to form Lake Beshear just upstream from its mouth on the Tradewater.

At Providence, the Tradewater has a mean annual discharge of 1,070 cubic feet per second.

The river has a low gradient with a gentle flow along much of its course. It forms a rough boundary between the Shawnee Hills  physiographic region to the northeast and the Pennyroyal physiographic region to the southwest. The Shawnee Hills region is underlain by Pennsylvanian limestone, sandstone, and shale which contain deposits of coal. The Pennyroyal region, which is drained by tributaries of the upper Tradewater, is a dissected upland plateau underlain by Mississippian limestone bedrock.

By 1990, heavy mining activity in the region had filled the river with silt.

See also
List of rivers of Kentucky

References

External links
KYwater.org: Tradewater Basin Description

Rivers of Kentucky
Tributaries of the Ohio River
Rivers of Christian County, Kentucky
Rivers of Hopkins County, Kentucky